Rich Dad is a brand established by Robert Kiyosaki for a series of educational books and games about personal finance.

Books
Rich Dad Poor Dad was written by Robert Kiyosaki and advocates financial independence primarily through financial literacy and understanding money the way a rich person does. The author argues that the reason why so many poor and middle class people don't become rich is because they simply don't understand money and have values or beliefs that prevent them from getting there, such as "all rich people are greedy". The book explains that the wealthy teach their children about money to ensure their financial success in life while the poor and middle class rely mostly on the school system which does not teach anything about money, even at the college level in business schools.

The book does not outline steps on how to become rich or what specifically to invest in but Kiyosaki does identify real estate as the primary asset type that helps in attaining greater wealth because of its ability to generate cash flow while appreciating over time as well as having large tax saving benefits for Americans. The book also highly advocates having a business, owning paper assets such as stocks, bonds, mutuals funds as well as being an entrepreneur. However, he argues that understanding money and being able to read financial statements and having financial literacy is the key to being successful in any area of investing.

The title of the book refers to the main story that is told about Robert Kiyosaki himself as a young boy at the age of 9 when he became curious about money. Through this story the book explains the differences between the values, beliefs, actions, and results of a "rich" and "poor" person from the perspective of a neutral and curious young Robert who observes his own dad who he calls Poor Dad and his best friends dad who is Rich Dad. His Rich Dad agrees to teach him and his own son about money when he asks and the lessons are told throughout the book. The story shows the two fathers as being at about the same level of wealth when Robert was 9 years old and being vastly different by the time they passed away.

Originally self-published before being picked up commercially, Kiyosaki followed the original book with Rich Dad's CASHFLOW Quadrant and then Rich Dad's Guide to Investing. A Rich Dad series of books followed there after with "Rich Dad Advisors" authoring many of them.

Educational Board Games
Kiyosaki stresses the value of games, particularly Monopoly, as tools for learning basic financial strategies such as "trade four green houses for one red hotel." Kiyosaki has created several games to reinforce the information and lessons in his books. 

Cashflow 101, currently revised and redesigned as just Cashflow, is a board game designed by Kiyosaki, which aims to teach the players financial literacy by filling in and updating a personal financial statement throughout the game and to focus on cash flow when investing to attain financial independence and "escape the Rat Race". 

There are two stages to the game. In the first, "the rat race", the player aims to raise his or her character's passive income to exceed the character's expenses through a variety of investment opportunities and understanding their money through accounting so they can exit the rat race. The winner is determined in the second stage, "the fast track", where the player is already rich. To win, a player must get his character to buy his "dream" or accumulate $50,000 in additional monthly cash flow. Although the official winner is in the second stage, the main object and success in the game is focused on the ability to get out of the rat race. While the players are competing to get on to the fast track the quickest, the game is open and requires that another player check or audit your financial accounting. 

The game forces the players to do the accounting themselves. The financial statement is in place of "score cards". Therefore, players can see clearly what is happening with their money and shows how assets are expected to generate passive income and liabilities increase expenses.

Cashflow 202, now discontinued by Rich Dad Co., was made as an expansion to Cashflow 101 and requires it to be able to play. Cashflow 202 was designed to be the third stage of the game and for more advanced or sophisticated game play. The first game mainly focused on borrowing, stocks, CDs, mutual funds, charity, real estate, business, and limited partnerships while Cashflow 202 introduced options, short selling, royalties, insurance, shared deals, buying/selling to other players, and overall greater volatility.

Controversy

In 2010, the Canadian Broadcasting Corporation investigated the Rich Dad seminars associated with Kiyosaki on their consumer advocacy program, Marketplace. They found that one-day free seminars were conducted at which three-day courses were offered for $500. At the three-day classes, participants were offered longer courses priced between $12,000 and $45,000. A hidden camera was employed at a $500 seminar in Kitchener, Ontario, showing the trainer, Marc Mousseau, advising participants to request that their credit-card be raised and giving out scripts with instructions for how to ask for limits as high as $100,000.

The show interviewed Bob Aaron, a lawyer whose practice is 25% real estate law, who said that some of Mousseau's advice was unusual and unlikely to work, such as advising that a developer might give two condos free when selling ten, getting an option to buy the house at a later date and buying a house in pre-foreclosure. The program also found a claim by the trainer to be untrue; he claimed to have been part of a deal that made $32 million on a mobile home park in Saskatchewan, but the park did not exist. The instructor was described as "overbearing, obnoxious, and rude" by an attendee, after showing video footage of his behavior.  

On August 20, 2012, one of Kiyosaki's companies, Rich Global LLC, filed for bankruptcy in Wyoming Bankruptcy Court. The move followed a ruling by a U.S. District Court jury that former business partners of Kiyosaki were entitled to $23,687,957.21 of the profits from events they helped to set up for Kiyosaki including a 2002 appearance at New York's Madison Square Garden.

Rich Dad Education

Part of Rich Dad Education's mission is to increase financial literacy among youth. Rich Dad Education’s CEO Anthony Humpage was interviewed by Business Insider in July 2014 for teaching the lessons that college bound teens need to know about financial independence.

References

American brands
Personal finance education
Series of books
Books by Robert Kiyosaki